The Saint Kitts and Nevis national under-20 football team represents Saint Kitts and Nevis in international football at this age level and is controlled by the Saint Kitts and Nevis Football Association.

Schedule and Results

2018

2022

Current squad 
 The following players were called up for the 2022 CONCACAF U-20 Championship.
 Match dates: 18 June – 3 July 2022
 Caps and goals correct as of:' 18 June 2022
 Names in italics denote players who have been capped for the senior team.''

See also
Saint Kitts and Nevis national football team

References

U
Saint Kitts and Nevis